Colydium is a genus of cylindrical bark beetles in the family Zopheridae. There are about five described species in Colydium.

Species
 Colydium glabriculum Stephan, 1989
 Colydium lineola Say, 1826
 Colydium nigripenne LeConte, 1863
 Colydium robustum Stephan, 1989
 Colydium thomasi Stephan, 1989

References

Further reading

 
 
 

Zopheridae